Digitus V or fifth digit can refer to:
 Little finger (digitus V manus)
 little toe (digitus V pedis)